was a retainer of the Takeda family. He was known as one of the "Twenty-Four Generals of Takeda Shingen". 
His name is also seen with different kanji as 信形. 
Nobukata served under both Takeda Nobutora and Takeda Shingen and also was tasked with young Shingen. 

In 1541 Nobutora, along with Amari Torayasu, was driven out from the position of the head of Takeda clan, and he served as the general for Shingen often leading the troops into a battle when Shingen could not. 

In 1542, he would personally finish off Takato Yoritsugu at Battle of Ankokuji, shortly after the Siege of Fukuyo. 

In 1545, he successfully besieged and captured Takato castle. 

In 1546, he defeated Uesugi Norimasa at Usui Toge in Battle of Odaihara. With these victories, he was instrumental in gaining the control of Shinano Province and proved himself a skilled tactician. He was known as one of the "Twenty-Four Generals of Takeda Shingen". 
After these victories, Nobukata increasingly became selfish and started to hold victory ceremonies without firmly winning a battle. These victories rapidly became fewer. As Nobukata was the eldest of the Takeda retainers and having educated Shingen, few could criticize his actions. 

In 1547, during Siege of Shika Castle, Nobukata and his troops were almost completely wiped out in a battle and without a timely rescue by Hara Toratane, Nobukata himself would have been in danger as well. Shingen offered the following waka to Nobukata to encourage him to correct his act.

Dare mo Miyo Mitsureba Yagate Kaku Tsuki no Izayofu Ana ya Hito no Yo no Naka
誰もみよ 満つればやがて 欠く月の 十六夜ふ穴や 人の世の中

(Translation) "Everyone sees that even a beautiful full moon starts to change its shape, becoming smaller as the time passes. Even in our human lives, things are as it is."

In 1548, at the Battle of Uedahara, Nobutaka satisfied with a victory, had his troops stand down to hold a ceremony. Murakami Yoshikiyo's troops regrouped and counterattacked, killing Nobutaka and Amari Torayasu.

The Meiji era politician Itagaki Taisuke was Nobukata's direct descendant, 12 generations removed.

In fiction

In NHK's 2007 Taiga drama Fūrinkazan, Itagaki is played by Sonny Chiba. Like in the novel it was adapted from, Nobukata was portrayed more heroically, supposedly the one who was trying to rein in the young Takeda Harunobu (Shingen) from his arrogance and chose to sacrifice himself so that Harunobu may survive the Battle of Uedahara.

Genealogy 

Source
"Kai Kokushi". Matsudaira Sadayoshi. 1814. Japan.(Aduchi-Momoyama period part)
"Kwansei-choshu Shokafu". Hotta Masaatsu, Hayashi jyussai. 1799. Japan.(Aduchi-Momoyama period part)
"Osamuraichu Senzogaki-keizucho"(Edo period part)

References

External links 
  "Legendary Takeda's 24 Generals" at Yamanashi-kankou.jp

1548 deaths
Japanese warriors killed in battle
Samurai
Takeda retainers
Year of birth unknown
Deified Japanese people